North Thormanby Island is an island off of the Sunshine Coast British Columbia, Canada, located 17 km west of Sechelt.

Geography
The island is noted for its sandy beaches and is a popular anchorage for small boats cruising the strait of Georgia.

North Thormanby Island is in the province of British Columbia, Canada, and forms part of the Gulf Islands. At low tide it is possible to walk the beach all around the island. This is not trespassing, as the foreshore or intertidal zone is not private property. Some landmarks in the area include:
 Buccaneer Bay
 Buccaneer Bay Park - Grassy Point, south tip of North Thormanby. The islands are separate at high tide.
 Water Bay - on South Thormanby.
 Smuggler Cove Marine Park - on the mainland.
 Simson Marine Park - on South Thormanby.
 Frenchmans Cove - on the mainland.

History
The first European Explorer to visit Thormanby Island was Jose Maria Narváez who anchored here on July 12, 1791 and called Thormanby Island Isla de San Ignacio.
The name Thormanby was given to the island by Captain George Richards, who surveyed the area with his ship Plumper in 1860. The name Thormanby was that of the horse who won the Epsom derby, a famous horse race, that year. Several other place names in the area come from the Epsom derby. The island was uninhabited and forested until 1905, when John William (Jack) Vaughan built the first cabin and a wharf on the island. At the time of World War One, Vaughan sold the north east corner of the island to the BC Telephone Company, which developed a small resort there with rowboats, boat houses, a lodge, a telephone and cabin there. Upon returning from the first world war in 1919, Vaughan bought back the development from BC Tel, opening it to the public as a resort in 1923, while the Union Steamship Company daily service to North Thormanby Island.

During the 1930s, a small recreational community of cottages was built along Vaucroft beach on the Buccaneer Bay side of the island. 
The Union Steamship stopped its service to Thormanby in 1946, after which logging operations of the old growth trees on the top of the island were carried out. Starting in the late 1960s, the island gradually was subdivided into recreational properties.
The present wharf on North Thormanby island is known as the Vaucroft port facility. This wharf has been administered by the Sunshine Coast Regional District since 2001.

On the southern tip of the island is the Buccaneer Bay Provincial Park. On the northern tip of the island is the small community of Vaucroft Beach. The island is connected to South Thormanby Island.

References 

Sunshine Coast (British Columbia)
Islands of the Gulf Islands